John Lloyd (c. 1560 – 1606), of Bodridis, Llanarmon yn Iâl, Denbighshire, was a Welsh politician.

He was a Member (MP) of the Parliament of England for Denbighshire in 1597.

References

1560s births
1606 deaths
16th-century Welsh politicians
Members of the Parliament of England for Denbighshire
Members of the Parliament of England (pre-1707) for constituencies in Wales
English MPs 1597–1598